NoMad Piazza is a pedestrian venue located in New York City on Broadway between 25th and 31st. The area, within Manhattan's NoMad neighborhood, was cordoned off to traffic as part of the NYC Open Streets program, which is run by the NYC DOT, in an effort to allow restaurants to expand outdoor dining as was required for social distancing measures put in place by the city in 2020. Parts of the road closure have since become permanent and local businesses have made their move into the streets a salient feature of the area. The St. James and Townsend Buildings reside in the southern block and 31st street serves as the north boundary.

Open Streets and New Urbanism 
The Open Streets on Broadway program, of which the Piazza is a part, is managed by the Flatiron/NoMad Partnership and supported by the NoMad Alliance. Open streets initiatives existed prior to the pandemic and are cited as an example of New Urbanism's, or sometimes Tactical Urbanism, re-purposing existing areas in metropolitan areas; however, with the need for social distancing, and for businesses to find a way to remain open, areas such as the NoMad Piazza increased substantially in the last three years in a number of cities all over the world.

Controversy 
There are critics of the design, however. For example, in June 2022, the "Broadway Vision" project, part of the Bloomberg administration's goal of creating "pedestrian friendly" zones in the city, was called into question after a taxi jumped a curb and hit a cyclist at 29th and Broadway. The crash prompted Mayor Adams to comment: “Traffic violence is preventable, and I will do everything in my power to prevent another crash when we already have the tools in our toolbox to prevent it.”

References

External links
Community groups and organizations
 The NoMad Alliance
 Flatiron/NoMad Partnership

News and blogs

 Summer 2021 New York City Art Guide

Economy of New York City
New Urbanism
Urban design